Coronation Street is a British television soap opera created by Granada Television and shown on ITV since 9 December 1960. The programme centres around a cobbled, terraced street in the fictional Weatherfield, a town based on inner-city Salford, England.

Originally broadcast twice weekly, the series began airing six times a week in 2017. The programme was conceived by scriptwriter Tony Warren. Warren's initial proposal was rejected by the station's founder Sidney Bernstein, but he was persuaded by producer Harry Elton to produce the programme for 13 pilot episodes. The show has since become a significant part of British culture.

Coronation Street is made by Granada's successor, ITV Studios, at MediaCityUK and shown in all ITV regions, as well as internationally. In 2010, upon its 50th anniversary, the series was recognised by Guinness World Records, as the world's longest-running television soap opera. Initially influenced by the conventions of kitchen sink realism, Coronation Street is noted for its depiction of a down-to-earth, working-class community, combined with light-hearted humour and strong characters. The show currently averages around six million viewers per episode. The show premiered its 10,000th episode on 7 February 2020, and celebrated its 60th anniversary later that year.

History

1960s
The first episode was aired on 9 December 1960 at 7 pm, and was not initially a critical success; Daily Mirror columnist Ken Irwin claimed the series would only last three weeks. Granada Television had commissioned only 13 episodes, and some inside the company doubted the show would last beyond its planned production run. Despite the criticism, viewers were immediately drawn into the serial, won over by Coronation Streets ordinary characters. The programme also made use of Northern English language and dialect; affectionate local terms like "eh, chuck?", "nowt" (from nought, meaning nothing), and "by 'eck!" became widely heard on British television for the first time. Early episodes told the story of student Ken Barlow (William Roache), who had won a place at university, and thus found his working-class background — as well as his younger brother David (Alan Rothwell) and his parents, Frank (Frank Pemberton) and Ida (Noel Dyson) — something of an embarrassment. The character was one of the few to have experienced much of life outside of Coronation Street. In some ways this predicts the growth of globalisation. In an episode from 1961, Barlow declares: "You can't go on just thinking about your own street these days. We're living with people on the other side of the world. There's more to worry about than Elsie Tanner (Pat Phoenix) and her boyfriends." Roache is the only remaining member of the original cast, which makes him the longest-serving actor in Coronation Street, and in British and global soap history.

In March 1961, Coronation Street reached number 1 in the television ratings and remained there for the rest of the year. Earlier in 1961, a Television Audience Measurement (TAM) showed that 75% of available viewers (15 million) tuned into Corrie, and by 1964 the programme had over 20 million regular viewers, with ratings peaking on 2 December 1964, at 21.36 million viewers. In spite of rising popularity with viewers, Coronation Street was criticised by some for its outdated portrayal of the urban working class, and its representation of a community that was a nostalgic fantasy. After the first episode in 1960, the Daily Mirror printed: "The programme is doomed from the outset ... For there is little reality in this new serial, which apparently, we have to suffer twice a week." By 1968, critics were suggesting that the programme no longer reflected life in 1960s Britain, a decade which had seen significant economic and social change in the nation. Granada hurried to update the programme, with the hope of introducing more issue-driven stories, including Lucille Hewitt (Jennifer Moss) becoming addicted to drugs, Jerry Booth (Graham Haberfield) being in a storyline about homosexuality, Emily Nugent (Eileen Derbyshire) having an out-of-wedlock child, and introducing a black family, but all of these ideas were dropped for fear of upsetting viewers.

In 1964, Coronation Street appointed new producer, Tim Aspinall.  Aspinall decided on a new broom policy and 'The Bloody Purge' of 1964 began, with nine actors being sacked in total. The first cast member to be written out was Lynne Carol, who had played Martha Longhurst since episode two and the preview of the programme. Her sacking was so controversial that fellow actress Violet Carson (Ena Sharples) threatened to quit, but she was eventually persuaded not to.  The media reported extensively on the storyline, and when Lynne Carol took a private trip to the Daily Mail Ideal Home Exhibition in London, she was mobbed by fans and asked to leave on the grounds of public safety. Many, including Coronation Street writer H.V. Kershaw, saw the killing of Martha as a desperate move to boost viewer ratings.

1970s
The show's production team was tested when many core cast members left the programme in the early 1970s. When Arthur Leslie died suddenly in 1970, his character, Rovers landlord Jack Walker, died off screen shortly afterwards. Anne Reid quit as Valerie Barlow; her character was killed off in 1971, electrocuting herself with a faulty hairdryer. Ratings reached a low of eight million in February 1973, when Pat Phoenix quit as Elsie Tanner and Doris Speed (Annie Walker) took two months' leave due to bereavement. The audience of ITV's other flagship soap opera Crossroads increased markedly at this time, as its established cast, such as Meg Richardson (Noele Gordon), grew in popularity. These sudden departures forced the writing team to quickly develop characters who had previously stood in the background. The roles of mostly younger characters including Bet Lynch (Julie Goodyear), Deirdre Hunt (Anne Kirkbride), Rita Littlewood (Barbara Knox), Mavis Riley (Thelma Barlow) and Ivy Tyldesley (Lynne Perrie) were built up between 1972 and 1973 (with Perrie's character being renamed to the better-known "Tilsley"), and characters such as Gail Potter (Helen Worth), Blanche Hunt (Patricia Cutts/Maggie Jones), and Vera Duckworth (Liz Dawn) first appearing in 1974. These characters would remain at the centre of the programme for many years, with Gail still being in the show nearly half a century after her first appearance. Comic storylines had been popular in the series in the 1960s but had become sparse during the early 1970s. These were re-introduced by new producer Bill Podmore who joined the series in 1976. He had worked on Granada comedy productions prior to his appointment.

In September 1977, the News of the World quoted actor Stephen Hancock (Ernest Bishop) as saying 'The Street kills an actor. I'm just doing a job, not acting. The scriptwriters have turned me into Ernie Bishop. I've tried to resist it but it is very hard not to play the part all the time, even at home.' This was the first sight the public had of a bitter argument between Hancock and Granada Television. Hancock objected to the cast payment system and threatened to quit the show to safeguard his principles. The main dispute was between Hancock and Podmore, with Podmore being nicknamed 'The Godfather' by the British media. The basis of Hancock's argument was that different actors were guaranteed different numbers of episode appearances per year, thus some were paid more than others.  Actors from the earliest days of the programme, including Pat Phoenix, Doris Speed and Peter Adamson, were guaranteed payment for every one of the year's episodes, regardless of whether or not they actually appeared. Podmore was not willing to change what he called a 'complex and well-established system', leading Hancock to stand by his principles and resign. The problem now shifted, and writers had to write Ernie out but save his wife Emily (Eileen Derbyshire). The decision was made for Ernest to be killed off in a bungled robbery at Mike Baldwin's (Johnny Briggs) factory, where he worked in payroll. Ernest was killed by a single gunshot to the stomach on 11 January 1978.  It was the first time that violence on such a scale had been shown on Coronation Street and after the episode was aired, Granada's switchboard was jammed by angry viewers. Letters of complaint arrived in their hundreds, and the Lobby Against TV Violence fiercely objected Granada's decision to broadcast the episode.  Granada stated that the storyline was not about violence, but that it aimed to show the desolation and loss felt by Ernest's widow, Emily. Coronation Street had little competition within its prime-time slot, and certain critics suggested that the programme had grown complacent, moving away from socially viable storylines, and again presenting a dated view of working-class life.

1980s
Peter Adamson, who had played Len Fairclough since 1961, was sacked in 1983 for breach of contract. He had been warned by Granada Television for writing unauthorised newspaper articles criticising the show and cast. Coronation Street producer Podmore sacked Adamson when it was revealed he had sold his memoirs after the previous warning. The sacking coincided with allegations of Adamson having indecently assaulted two young girls. In April 1983, a newspaper reported that Adamson had been arrested for indecently assaulting two eight-year-old girls at a swimming pool. The police complaint was that Adamson's hands had strayed while giving the girls swimming lessons. Granada Television gave Adamson financial support through his legal problems, with a Crown Court jury finding him not guilty in July 1983. Adamson's dispute over his memoirs and newspaper articles was not known to the public and the media reported that Adamson had been dismissed because of the shame indecent assault allegations had brought onto Granada and the Coronation Street brand. Len Fairclough was killed off-screen in a motorway crash on 7 December 1983. To demonise the character, it was revealed that he had been returning home from an affair, cheating on his wife Rita (Barbara Knox). Adamson celebrated the character's death by delivering an obituary on TV-am dressed as an undertaker.

During 1988, actor Christopher Quinten, who had played Brian Tilsley since 27 December 1978, told bosses at Granada that he was going to move to the United States to marry his then-fiancée, American talk show host Leeza Gibbons and to build an acting career in Los Angeles. In announcing his resignation, Quinten tried to ensure that his role would be left open for him to return in the event that his stint in America failed. At the time, his character was married to Gail and the story conference called to write Brian out struggled to find a justifiable way to write him out while still leaving enough scope for a possible return. The decision was made that Brian should die. Quinten was in Los Angeles when the storyline was decided, and upon his return to the United Kingdom, he was shocked at Brian's fate and threatened to fly back to America so that scenes could not be filmed.  He was talked round by co-star Helen Worth, who pointed out that he might be blacklisted by Equity if he quit the programme abruptly. Brian Tilsley's death was broadcast on 15 February 1989. After the breakdown of his marriage to Gail, Brian started spending his evenings going to discos and meeting up with various women. He tried to protect a young lady from a group of thugs outside a nightclub, but was stabbed in the stomach. He died as a result of his injuries. The stabbing brought massive complaints from viewers and Mary Whitehouse delivered an angry sermon about television violence.

Between 1980 and 1989, Coronation Street underwent some of the most radical changes since its launch. By May 1984, William Roache stood as the only original cast member, after the departures of Violet Carson (Ena Sharples) in 1980, Doris Speed (Annie Walker) in 1983, and both Pat Phoenix (Elsie Tanner) and Jack Howarth (Albert Tatlock) in 1984. Albert Tatlock's departure came when his character's off screen death was announced several months after the death of actor Jack Howarth at the age of 88. While the press predicted the end of Corrie, H. V. Kershaw declared that "There are no stars in Coronation Street. The show had also gained a new rival on Channel 4 with the launch of Brookside, and BBC was preparing to launch EastEnders, which would first air in February 1985. Writers drew on the show's many archetypes, with established characters stepping into the roles left by the original cast. Phyllis Pearce (Jill Summers) was hailed as the new Ena Sharples in 1982, the Duckworths moved into No.9 in 1983 and slipped into the role once held by the Ogdens, while Percy Sugden (Bill Waddington) appeared in 1983 and took over the grumpy war veteran role from Albert Tatlock. The question of who would take over the Rovers Return after Annie Walker's 1983 exit was answered in 1985 when Bet Lynch (who also mirrored the vulnerability and strength of Elsie Tanner) was installed as landlady. In 1983, Shirley Armitage (Lisa Lewis) became the first major black character in her role as machinist at Baldwin's Casuals.

Ken Barlow married Deirdre Langton (Anne Kirkbride) on 27 July 1981. The episode was watched by over 15 million viewers – more ITV viewers than the wedding of Prince Charles and Lady Diana two days later. In the 1980s relationships were cemented between established characters: Alf Roberts (Bryan Mosley) married Audrey Potter (Sue Nicholls) in 1985; Kevin Webster (Michael Le Vell) married Sally Seddon (Sally Whittaker) in 1986; Bet Lynch married Alec Gilroy (Roy Barraclough) in 1987; and 1988 saw the marriages of widowed Ivy Tilsley to Don Brennan (Geoffrey Hinsliff), and the long-awaited union of Mavis Riley and Derek Wilton (Peter Baldwin), after over a decade of on-off romances and a failed marriage attempt in 1984.

In 1982, the arrival of Channel 4, and its edgy new soap opera Brookside, sparked one of the biggest changes for Coronation Street. Unlike Coronation Street, which had a very nostalgic view of working-class life, Brookside brought together working and middle-class families in a more contemporary environment. The dialogue often included expletives and the stories were more hard-hitting, and of the current Zeitgeist. Whereas stories at this time in Coronation Street were largely about family affairs, Brookside concentrated on social affairs such as industrial action, unemployment, drugs, rape, and the black market. The BBC also introduced a new prime time soap opera, EastEnders in 1985. While ratings for Coronation Street remained consistent throughout the decade, EastEnders regularly obtained higher viewing figures due to its omnibus episodes shown at weekends. The Coronation Street episode broadcast on 2 January 1985 attracted 21.40 million viewers, making it the most-watched episode in the show's history based on a single showing. Subsequent episodes would achieve higher figures when the original broadcast and omnibus edition figures were combined. With prime time competition, Corrie was again seen as being old fashioned, with the introduction of the 'normal' Clayton family in 1985 being a failure with viewers, being written out the following year. Between 1988 and 1989, many aspects of the show were modernised by new producer David Liddiment. A new exterior set had been built in 1982, and in 1989 it was redeveloped to include new houses and shops. Production techniques were also changed with a new studio being built, and the inclusion of more location filming, which had moved the show from being shot on film to videotape in 1988. Due to new pressures, an introduction of the third weekly episode aired on 20 October 1989, to broadcast each Friday at 7:30 pm.

The 1980s featured some of the most prominent storylines in the programme's history, such as Deirdre Barlow's affair with Mike Baldwin (Johnny Briggs) in 1983, the first soap storyline to receive widespread media attention. The feud between Ken Barlow and Mike Baldwin would continue for many years, with Mike even marrying Ken's daughter, Susan (Wendy Jane Walker). In 1986, there was a fire at the Rovers Return. The episode that aired on Christmas Day 1987, attracted a combined audience (original and omnibus) of 26.65 million – a figure helped by the fact that this episode heralded the departure of immensely-popular character Hilda Ogden (Jean Alexander). Between 1986 and 1989, the story of Rita Fairclough's (Barbara Knox) psychological abuse at the hands of Alan Bradley (Mark Eden), and then his subsequent death under the wheels of a Blackpool tram in December 1989, was played out. This storyline gave the show its highest combined viewing figure in its history with 26.93 million for the episode that aired on 15 (and 19) March 1989, where Alan is hiding from the police after trying to kill Rita in the previous episode. This rating is sometimes incorrectly credited to the 8 December 1989 tram death episode.

1990s
In spite of updated sets and production changes, Coronation Street still received criticism. In 1992, chairman of the Broadcasting Standards Council, Lord Rees-Mogg, criticised the low representation of ethnic minorities, and the programme's portrayal of the cosy familiarity of a bygone era, particularly as many comparable neighbours in the real life Greater Manchester area had a significant percentage of black and Asian residents. Some newspapers ran headlines such as "Coronation Street shuts out blacks" (The Times), and "'Put colour in t'Street" (Daily Mirror). Patrick Stoddart of The Times wrote: "The millions who watch Coronation Street – and who will continue to do so despite Lord Rees-Mogg – know real life when they see it ... in the most confident and accomplished soap opera television has ever seen". Black and Asian characters had appeared from time to time over the years, but it was not until 1999 that the show featured its first regular non-white family, the Desai family.

New characters Des (Philip Middlemiss) and Steph Barnes (Amelia Bullmore) moved into one of the new houses in 1990, being dubbed by the media as Yuppies. Raquel Wolstenhulme (Sarah Lancashire) first appeared at the beginning of 1991 and went on to become one of the most popular characters of the era until her departure in 1996, followed by a brief comeback three years later. The McDonald family were developed and the fiery relationships between Liz (Beverly Callard), Jim (Charles Lawson), Steve (Simon Gregson) and Andy (Nicholas Cochrane) interested viewers. Other newcomers were wheelchair user and pensioner Maud Grimes (Elizabeth Bradley), middle-aged cafe owner Roy Cropper (David Neilson), young married couple Gary and Judy Mallett (Ian Mercer and Gaynor Faye), as well as middle-aged butcher Fred Elliott (John Savident) and his son Ashley Peacock (Steven Arnold). The amount of slapstick and physical humour in storylines increased during the 1990s, with comical characters such as supermarket manager Reg Holdsworth (Ken Morley) and his water bed.

In 1997, Brian Park took over as producer, with the idea of promoting young characters as opposed to the older cast. On his first day, he cut the characters of Derek Wilton (Peter Baldwin), Don Brennan (Geoffrey Hinsliff), Percy Sugden (Bill Waddington), Bill Webster (Peter Armitage), Billy Williams (Frank Mills) and Maureen Holdsworth (Sherrie Hewson). Thelma Barlow, who played Derek's wife Mavis, was angered by the firing of her co-star and resigned. The production team lost some of its key writers when Barry Hill, Adele Rose and Julian Roach all resigned as well.

In line with Park's suggestion, younger characters were introduced during 1997 and 1998. A teenage Nick Tilsley was recast, played by Adam Rickitt following the departure of original actor Warren Jackson, single mother Zoe Tattersall (Joanne Froggatt) first appeared, and the problem Battersby family moved into No.5. Storylines focussed on tackling 'issues', such as drug dealers, eco-warriors, religious cults, and a transsexual woman. Park quit in 1998, after deciding that he had done what he intended to do; he maintained that his biggest achievement was the introduction of Hayley Patterson (Julie Hesmondhalgh), the first transgender character in a British soap. The character married Roy Cropper soon after her arrival.

Some viewers were alienated by the new Coronation Street, and sections of the media voiced their disapproval. Having received criticism of being too out of touch, Corrie now struggled to emulate the more modern Brookside and EastEnders. In the Daily Mirror, Victor Lewis-Smith wrote: "Apparently it doesn't matter that this is a first-class soap opera, superbly scripted and flawlessly performed by a seasoned repertory company." One of Coronation Streets best known storylines took place in March/April 1998, with Deirdre Rachid (Anne Kirkbride) being wrongfully imprisoned after a relationship with con-man Jon Lindsay (Owen Aaronovitch). The episode in which Deirdre was sent to prison had an audience of 19 million viewers, and 'Free the Weatherfield One' campaigns sprung up in a media frenzy. Then Prime Minister Tony Blair even passed comment on Deirdre's sentencing in Parliament. Deirdre was freed after three weeks, with Granada stating that they had always intended for her to be released, in spite of the media interest.

2000s
On 8 December 2000, the show celebrated its 40th anniversary by broadcasting a live, hour-long episode. King Charles III (then Prince of Wales) appeared as himself in an ITV News bulletin report. Earlier in the year, 13-year-old Sarah-Louise Platt (Tina O'Brien) had become pregnant and given birth to a baby girl, Bethany, on 4 June. The February episode where Gail was told of her daughter's pregnancy was watched by 15 million viewers. From 1999 to 2001, issue-led storylines were introduced such as Toyah Battersby's (Georgia Taylor) rape, Roy and Hayley Cropper (David Neilson and Julie Hesmondhalgh) abducting their foster child, Sarah Platt's Internet chat room abduction and Alma Halliwell's (Amanda Barrie) death from cervical cancer. Such storylines were unpopular with viewers and ratings dropped and in October 2001, Macnaught was abruptly moved to another Granada department and Carolyn Reynolds took over. In 2002, Kieran Roberts was appointed as producer and aimed to re-introduce "gentle storylines and humour", after deciding that the Street should not try to compete with other soaps.

In July 2002, Gail married Richard Hillman (Brian Capron), a recently introduced financial advisor who had already left Duggie Ferguson (John Bowe) to die after he fell down a set of ladders during an argument, and murdered his ex-wife Patricia (Annabelle Apsion), before going on to kill neighbour Maxine Peacock (Tracy Shaw); and attempt to kill both his mother-in-law Audrey Roberts (Sue Nicholls) and her longtime friend, Emily Bishop (Eileen Derbyshire), for financial gain due to his mounting debts. After confessing his crimes to Gail in a double episode two-hander in February 2003, Hillman left the street for two weeks before returning with the intent of killing himself as well as Gail, her children Sarah and David (Jack P. Shepherd), and granddaughter Bethany, before driving them into a canal – though the Platt family survived whilst Richard drowned. This came just months after Sarah had survived serious injuries after being passenger in a stolen car which crashed. The storyline received wide press attention, and viewing figures peaked at 19.4 million, with Hillman dubbed a "serial killer" by the media. Todd Grimshaw (Bruno Langley) became Corrie's first regular homosexual character. In 2003, another gay male character was introduced, Sean Tully (Antony Cotton). The bigamy of Peter Barlow (Chris Gascoyne) and his addiction to alcohol, later in the decade, Maya Sharma's (Sasha Behar) revenge on former lover Dev Alahan (Jimmi Harkishin), Charlie Stubbs's (Bill Ward) psychological abuse of Shelley Unwin (Sally Lindsay), and the deaths of Mike Baldwin (Johnny Briggs), Vera Duckworth (Liz Dawn) and Fred Elliott (John Savident). In 2007, Tracy Barlow (Kate Ford) murdered Charlie Stubbs and claiming it was self-defence; the audience during this storyline peaked at 13.3 million. At the 2007 British Soap Awards, it won Best Storyline, and Ford was voted Best Actress for her portrayal.

In July 2007, after 34 years in the role of Vera Duckworth, Liz Dawn left the show due to ill health. After conversation between Dawn and producers Kieran Roberts and Steve Frost, the decision was made to kill Vera off.

Tina O'Brien revealed in the British press on 4 April 2007 that she would be leaving Coronation Street later in the year. Sarah-Louise, who was involved in some of the decade's most controversial stories, left in December 2007 with her daughter, Bethany. In 2008, Michelle learning that Ryan (Ben Thompson) was not her biological son, having been accidentally swapped at birth with Alex Neeson (Dario Coates). Carla Connor (Alison King) turned to Liam for comfort and developed feelings for him. In spite of knowing about her feelings, Liam married Maria Sutherland (Samia Longchambon). Maria and Liam's baby son was stillborn in April, and during an estrangement from Maria upon the death of their baby, Liam had a one-night stand with Carla, a story which helped pave the way for his departure.

In August 2008, Jed Stone (Kenneth Cope) returned after 42 years. Liam Connor and his ex-sister-in-law Carla gave into their feelings for each other and began an affair. Carla's fiancée Tony Gordon (Gray O'Brien) discovered the affair and had Liam killed in a hit-and-run in October. Carla struggled to come to terms with Liam's death, but decided she still loved Tony and married him on 3 December, in an episode attracting 10.3 million viewers. In April 2009 it was revealed that Eileen Grimshaw's (Sue Cleaver) father, Colin (Edward de Souza) – the son of Elsie Tanner's (Pat Phoenix) cousin Arnley – had slept with Eileen's old classmate, Paula Carp (Sharon Duce) while she was still at school, and that Paula's daughter Julie (Katy Cavanagh) was in fact also Colin's daughter. Other stories in 2009 included Maria giving birth to Liam's son and her subsequent relationship with Liam's killer Tony, Steve McDonald's (Simon Gregson) marriage to Becky Granger (Katherine Kelly) and Kevin Webster's (Michael Le Vell) affair with Molly Dobbs (Vicky Binns). On Christmas Day 2009, Sally Webster (Sally Dynevor) told husband Kevin that she had breast cancer, just as he was about to leave her for lover Molly.

2010s
The show began broadcasting in high-definition in May 2010, and on 17 September that year, Coronation Street entered Guinness World Records as the world's longest-running television soap opera after the American soap opera As the World Turns concluded. William Roache was listed as the world's longest-running soap actor. Coronation Street 50th anniversary week was celebrated with seven episodes, plus a special one-hour live episode, broadcast from 6–10 December. The episodes averaged 14 million viewers, a 52.1% share of the audience. The anniversary was also publicised with ITV specials and news broadcasts. In the storyline, Nick Tilsley and Leanne Battersby's bar — The Joinery — exploded during Peter Barlow's stag party. As a result, the viaduct was destroyed, sending a Metrolink tram careering onto the street, destroying D&S Alahan's Corner Shop and The Kabin. Two characters, Ashley Peacock (Steven Arnold) and Molly Dobbs (Vicky Binns), along with an unknown taxi driver, were killed as a result of the disaster. Rita Sullivan (Barbara Knox) survived, despite being trapped under the rubble of her destroyed shop. Fiz Stape (Jennie McAlpine) prematurely gave birth to a baby girl, Hope. The episode of EastEnders broadcast on the same day as Coronation Street 50th anniversary episode included a tribute, with the character Dot Branning (June Brown, who briefly appeared in the show during the 1970s) saying that she never misses an episode of Coronation Street.

2020s
On 7 February 2020, with its 60th anniversary less than a year away, Coronation Street aired its landmark 10,000th episode, the runtime of which was extended to 60 minutes. Producers stated that the episode would contain "a nostalgic trip down memory lane" and "a nod to its own past". A month later, ITV announced that production on the soap would have to be suspended, as the United Kingdom was put into a national lockdown due to the COVID-19 pandemic (see impact of the COVID-19 pandemic on television).

After an 11-week intermission for all cast and crew members, filming resumed in June 2020. The episodes would feature social distancing to adhere to the guidelines set by the British government, and it was confirmed that all actors over 70, as well as those with underlying health conditions, would not be allowed to be on set until it was safe to do so. This included Coronation Street veterans William Roache (Ken Barlow) at 88, Barbara Knox (Rita Tanner) at 87, Malcolm Hebden (Norris Cole) at 80 and Sue Nicholls (Audrey Roberts) at 76. Maureen Lipman (Evelyn Plummer) and David Neilson (Roy Cropper) returned to set slightly earlier due to being 73 and 71 respectively, as it was deemed safe to do so. By December all cast members had returned to set and on Wednesday 9 December 2020, the soap celebrated its 60th anniversary, with original plans for the episode forced to change due to COVID-19 guidelines. The anniversary week saw the conclusion of a long-running coercive control storyline that began in May 2019, with Geoff Metcalfe (Ian Bartholomew) abusing Yasmeen Nazir (Shelley King). The showdown, which resulted in the death of Geoff allowed social distancing rules to be relaxed on the condition that the crew members involved formed a social bubble prior to the filming. In late 2021 series producer Iain MacLeod announced that the original plans for the 60th Anniversary would now take place in a special week of episodes in October 2021.

On 12 October 2021, it was announced that Coronation Street would partake in a special crossover event involving multiple British soaps to promote the topic of climate change ahead of the 2021 United Nations Climate Change Conference. During the week, beginning from 1 November, social media clips featuring Liam Cavanagh (Jonny McPherson) and Amelia Spencer (Daisy Campbell) from Emmerdale, as well as Daniel Granger (Matthew Chambers) from Doctors  were featured on the programme, while events from Holby City were also referenced. A similar clip featuring Maria Connor (Samia Longchambon) was also featured on EastEnders. On 24 January 2022, ITV announced that as part of an overhaul of their evening programming, Coronation Street will permanently air as three 60-minute episodes per week from March 2022 onwards.

Characters

Since 1960, Coronation Street has featured many characters whose popularity with viewers and critics has differed greatly. The original cast was created by Tony Warren, with the characters of Ena Sharples (Violet Carson), Elsie Tanner (Pat Phoenix) and Annie Walker (Doris Speed) as central figures. These three women remained with the show for at least 20 years, and became archetypes of British soap opera, often being emulated by other serials. Ena was the street's busybody, battle-axe and self-proclaimed moral voice. Elsie was the tart with a heart, who was constantly hurt by men in the search for true love. Annie Walker, landlady of the Rovers Return Inn, had delusions of grandeur and saw herself as better than the other residents.

Coronation Street became known for the portrayal of strong female characters, including original cast characters like Ena, Annie and Elsie, and later Hilda Ogden (Jean Alexander), who first appeared in 1964; all four became household names during the 1960s. Warren's programme was largely matriarchal, which some commentators put down to the female-dominant environment in which he grew up. Consequently, the show has a long tradition of psychologically abused husbands, most famously Stan Ogden (Bernard Youens) and Jack Duckworth (Bill Tarmey), husbands of Hilda and Vera Duckworth (Liz Dawn), respectively.

Coronation Street's longest-serving character, Ken Barlow (William Roache) entered the storyline as a young radical, reflecting the youth of 1960s Britain, where figures like the Beatles, the Rolling Stones and the model Twiggy were to reshape the concept of youthful rebellion. Though the rest of the original Barlow family were killed off before the end of the 1970s, Ken, who for 27 years was the only character from the first episode remaining, has remained the constant link throughout the entire series. In 2011, Dennis Tanner (Philip Lowrie), another character from the first episode, returned to Coronation Street after a 43-year absence. Since 1984, Ken Barlow has been the show's only remaining original character. Emily Bishop (Eileen Derbyshire) had appeared in the series since January 1961, when the show was just weeks old, and was the show's longest-serving female character before she departed in January 2016 after 55 years. Rita Tanner (Barbara Knox) appeared on the show for one episode in December 1964, before returning as a full-time cast member in January 1972. She is currently the second longest-serving original cast member on the show. Roache and Knox are also the two oldest-working cast members on the soap at 90 and 89 years-old respectively.

Stan and Hilda Ogden were introduced in 1964, with Hilda becoming one of the most famous British soap opera characters of all time. In a 1982 poll, she was voted fourth-most recognisable woman in Britain, after Queen Elizabeth The Queen Mother, Queen Elizabeth II and Diana, Princess of Wales. Hilda's best-known attributes were her pinny, hair curlers, and the "muriel" in her living room with three "flying" duck ornaments. Hilda Ogden's departure on Christmas Day 1987, remains the highest-rated episode of Coronation Street ever, with nearly 27,000,000 viewers. Stan Ogden had been killed off in 1984 following the death of actor Bernard Youens after a long illness which had restricted his appearances towards the end.

Bet Lynch (Julie Goodyear) first appeared in 1966, before becoming a regular in 1970, and went on to become one of the most famous Corrie characters. Bet stood as the central character of the show from 1985 until departing in 1995, often being dubbed as "Queen of the Street" by the media, and indeed herself. The character briefly returned in June 2002 and November 2003.

Coronation Street and its characters often rely heavily on archetypes, with the characterisation of some of its current and recent cast based loosely on former characters. Phyllis Pearce (Jill Summers), Blanche Hunt (Maggie Jones) and Sylvia Goodwin (Stephanie Cole) embodied the role of the acid-tongued busybody originally held by Ena, Sally Webster (Sally Dynevor) has grown snobbish, like Annie, and a number of the programme's female characters, such as Carla Connor (Alison King), mirror the vulnerability of Elsie and Bet. Other recurring archetypes include the war veteran such as Albert Tatlock (Jack Howarth), Percy Sugden (Bill Waddington) and Gary Windass (Mikey North), the bumbling retail manager like Leonard Swindley (Arthur Lowe), Reg Holdsworth (Ken Morley), Norris Cole (Malcolm Hebden), quick-tempered, tough tradesmen like Len Fairclough (Peter Adamson), Jim McDonald (Charles Lawson), Tommy Harris (Thomas Craig) and Owen Armstrong (Ian Puleston-Davies), and the perennial losers such as Stan and Hilda, Jack and Vera, Les Battersby (Bruce Jones), Beth Tinker (Lisa George) and Kirk Sutherland (Andrew Whyment).

Villains are also common character types, such as Tracy Barlow (Kate Ford), Alan Bradley (Mark Eden), Jenny Bradley (Sally Ann Matthews), Rob Donovan (Marc Baylis), Frank Foster (Andrew Lancel), Tony Gordon (Gray O'Brien), Caz Hammond (Rhea Bailey), Richard Hillman (Brian Capron), Greg Kelly (Stephen Billington), Will Chatterton (Leon Ockenden), Nathan Curtis (Christopher Harper), Callum Logan (Sean Ward), Karl Munro (John Michie), Pat Phelan (Connor McIntyre), David Platt (Jack P. Shepherd), Maya Sharma (Sasha Behar), Kirsty Soames (Natalie Gumede), John Stape (Graeme Hawley), Geoff Metcalfe (Ian Bartholomew) and Gary Windass (Mikey North). The show's former archivist and scriptwriter Daran Little disagreed with the characterisation of the show as a collection of stereotypes. "Rather, remember that Elsie, Ena and others were the first of their kind ever seen on British television. If later characters are stereotypes, it's because they are from the same original mould. It is the hundreds of programmes that have followed which have copied Coronation Street."

Production

Broadcast format

Between 9 December 1960 and 3 March 1961, Coronation Street was broadcast twice weekly, on Wednesday and Friday. During this period, the Friday episode was broadcast live, with the Wednesday episode being pre-recorded 15 minutes later. When the programme went fully networked on 6 March 1961, broadcast days changed to Monday and Wednesday. The last regular episode to be shown live was broadcast on 3 February 1961.

The series was transmitted in black and white for the majority of the 1960s. Preparations were made to film episode 923, to be transmitted Wednesday 29 October 1969, in colour. This installment featured the street's residents on a coach trip to the Lake District. In the end, suitable colour film stock for the cameras could not be found and the footage was shot in black and white. The following episode, transmitted Monday 3 November, was videotaped in colour but featured black and white film inserts and title sequence. Like BBC1, the ITV network was officially broadcast in black and white at this point (though programmes were actually broadcast in colour as early as July that year for colour transmission testing and adjustment) so the episode was seen by most in black and white.

The ITV network, like BBC1, began full colour transmissions on 15 November 1969. Daran Little, for many years the official programme archivist, claims that the first episode to be transmitted in colour was episode 930 shown on 24 November 1969. In October 1970, a technicians' dispute turned into the Colour Strike when sound staff were denied a pay rise given to camera staff the year before for working with colour recording equipment. The terms of the work-to-rule were that staff refused to work with the new equipment (though the old black and white equipment had been disposed of by then) and therefore programmes were recorded and transmitted in black and white, including Coronation Street. The dispute was resolved in early 1971 and the last black and white episode was broadcast on 10 February 1971, although the episodes transmitted on 22 and 24 February 1971 had contained black and white location inserts.

From 22 March 2010, Coronation Street was produced in 1080/50i for transmission on HDTV platforms on ITV HD. The first transmission in this format was episode 7351 on 31 May 2010 with a new set of titles and re-recorded theme tune. On 26 May 2010 ITV previewed the new HD titles on the Coronation Street website. Due to copyright reasons only viewers residing in the UK could see them on the ITV site.

Production staff

Coronation Street's creator, Tony Warren, wrote the first 13 episodes of the programme in 1960, and continued to write for the programme intermittently until 1976. He later became a novelist, but retained links with Coronation Street. Warren died in 2016.

Harry Kershaw was the script editor for Coronation Street when the programme began in 1960, working alongside Tony Warren. Kershaw was also a script writer for the programme and the show's producer between 1962 and 1971. He remains the only person, along with John Finch, to have held the three posts of script editor, writer and producer. Adele Rose was Coronation Street's first female writer and the show's longest-serving writer, completing 455 scripts between 1961 and 1998. She also created Byker Grove. Rose also won a BAFTA award in 1993 for her work on the show.

Bill Podmore was the show's longest serving producer. By the time he stepped down in 1988 he had completed 13 years at the production helm. Nicknamed the "godfather" by the tabloid press, he was renowned for his tough, uncompromising style and was feared by both crew and cast alike. He is known for sacking Peter Adamson, the show's Len Fairclough, in 1983. Iain MacLeod is the current series producer.

Michael Apted, known for the Up! series of documentaries, was a director on the programme in the early 1960s. This period of his career marked the first of his many collaborations with writer Jack Rosenthal. Rosenthal, noted for such television plays as Bar Mitzvah Boy, began his career on the show, writing over 150 episodes between 1961 and 1969. Paul Abbott was a story editor on the programme in the 1980s and began writing episodes in 1989, but left in 1993 to produce Cracker, for which he later wrote, before creating his own dramas such as Touching Evil and Shameless. Russell T Davies was briefly a storyliner on the programme in the mid-1990s, also writing the script for the direct-to-video special "Viva Las Vegas!" He, too, has become a noted writer of his own high-profile television drama programmes, including Queer as Folk and the 2005 revival of Doctor Who. Jimmy McGovern also wrote some episodes.

Theme music
The show's theme music, a cornet piece, accompanied by a brass band plus clarinet and double bass, reminiscent of northern band music, was written by Eric Spear. The original theme tune was called "Lancashire Blues" and Spear was paid a £6 commission in 1960 to write it.

The identity of the trumpeter was not public knowledge until 1994, when jazz musician and journalist Ron Simmonds revealed that it was the Surrey musician Ronnie Hunt. He added, "an attempt was made in later years to re-record that solo, using Stan Roderick, but it sounded too good, and they reverted to the old one." In 2004, the Manchester Evening News published a contradictory story that a young musician from Wilmslow called David Browning had played the original version. However, after investigating further, his story was found to be false, Browning not knowing that the original trumpet player Ronnie Hunt was still alive, proving that he was the true and rightful player that performed the solo. With his union pay stubs and contract, Browning was proven false.

A new, completely re-recorded version of the theme tune replaced the original when the series started broadcasting in HD on 31 May 2010. It accompanied a new montage-style credits sequence featuring images of Manchester and Weatherfield. A reggae version of the theme tune was recorded by The I-Royals and released by Media Marvels and WEA in 1983.

Viewing figures
Episodes in the 1960s, 1970s and 1980s, regularly attracted figures of between 18 and 21 million viewers, and during the 1990s and early 2000s, 14 to 16 million per episode would be typical. Like most terrestrial television in the UK, a decline in viewership has taken place and the show posts an average audience of just under 9 million per episode , remaining one of the highest rated programmes in the UK. EastEnders and Coronation Street have often competed for the highest rated show.

The episode that aired on 2 January 1985, in which Bet Lynch (Julie Goodyear) finds out she has got the job as manager of the Rovers Return, is the highest-rated single episode in the show's history, attracting 21.40 million viewers. The 25 December 1987 episode, where Hilda Ogden (Jean Alexander) leaves the street to start a new life as a housekeeper for long-term employer Dr Lowther, attracted a combined audience of 26.65 million for its original airing and omnibus repeat on 27 December 1987. This is the second-highest combined rating in the show's history. The show attracted its highest-ever combined rating of 26.93 million for the episode that aired on 15 (and 19) March 1989, where Rita Fairclough (Barbara Knox) is in hospital and Alan Bradley (Mark Eden) is hiding from the police after trying to kill Rita in the previous episode.

Sets

The regular exterior buildings shown in Coronation Street include a row of terrace houses, several townhouses, and communal areas including a newsagents (The Kabin), a café (Roy's Rolls), a general grocery shop (D&S Alahan's), a factory (Underworld) and Rovers Return Inn public house. The Rovers Return Inn is the main meeting place for the show's characters.

Between 1960 and 1968, street scenes were transmitted/taped before a set constructed in a studio, with the house fronts reduced in scale to 3/4 and constructed from wood. In 1968 Granada built an outside set not all that different from the interior version previously used, with the wooden façades from the studio simply being erected on the new site. When the show began broadcasting in colour, these were replaced with brick façades, and back yards were added in the 1970s.

In 1982, a permanent full-street set was built in the Granada backlot, an area between Quay Street and Liverpool Road in Manchester. The set was constructed from reclaimed Salford brick. The set was updated in 1989 with the construction of a new factory, two shop units and three modern town houses on the south side of the street.

Between 1989 and 1999, the Granada Studios Tour allowed members of the public to visit the set. The exterior set was extended and updated in 1999. This update added to the Rosamund Street and Victoria Street façades, and added a viaduct on Rosamund Street. Most interior scenes are shot in the adjoining purpose-built studio.

In 2008, Victoria Court, an apartment building full of luxury flats, was started on Victoria Street.

In 2014, production moved to a new site at Trafford Wharf, a former dock area about two miles to the east, part of the MediaCityUK complex. The Trafford Wharf backlot is built upon a former truck stop site next to the Imperial War Museum North. It took two years from start to finish to recreate the iconic Street. The houses were built to almost full scale after previously being three-quarter size. On 5 April 2014, the staff began to allow booked public visits to the old Quay Street set. An advert, with a voiceover from Victoria Wood, appeared on TV to advertise the tour. The tour was discontinued in December 2015.

On 12 March 2018, the extension of the Victoria Street set was officially unveiled. The new set featured a garden, featuring a memorial bench paying tribute to the 22 victims of the Manchester Arena bombing, including Coronation Street "super fan" Martyn Hett. The precinct includes a Greater Manchester Police station called Weatherfield Police station. As part of a product placement deal between three companies and ITV Studios, new additions include a tram stop station which is named Weatherfield North with Transport for Greater Manchester Metrolink branding, while shop front facades of Costa Coffee and the Weatherfield branded Co-op Food store interior scenes have been screened. Exterior scenes at the new set first aired on 20 April 2018.
On 20 April 2018, ITV announced that they had been granted official approval of planning permission to allow booked public visits to the MediaCityUK Trafford Wharf set. Tours commenced on weekends from 26 May 2018 onwards. The set was further expanded in March 2022, with the addition of the Weatherfield Precinct, which took six months to build, and was inspired by Salford. The new section of the set included a two-storey construction featuring maisonettes, a staircase and balcony leading to the properties, a piazza and an array of shops and units.

Broadcast

United Kingdom
For 60 years, Coronation Street has remained at the centre of ITV's prime time schedule. The programme is usually shown in the UK in six episodes, over three evenings a week on ITV. Additional episodes have been broadcast at other times, such as between 22 and 26 November 2004, when eight episodes were shown. Occasional late night episodes of Coronation Street begin at 10 pm, due to the watershed.

From Friday 9 December 1960 until Friday 3 March 1961, the programme was shown in two episodes broadcast on Wednesday and Friday at 7 pm. Schedules were changed, and from Monday 6 March 1961 until Wednesday 11 October 1989, the programme was shown in two episodes broadcast Monday and Wednesday at 7:30 pm. A third weekly episode was introduced on Friday 20 October 1989, broadcast at 7:30 pm. From 1996, an extra episode was broadcast at 7:30 pm on Sunday nights.

Aside from Granada, the programme originally appeared on the following stations of the ITV network: Anglia Television, Associated-Rediffusion, Television Wales and the West, Scottish Television, Southern Television and Ulster Television. From episode 14 on Wednesday 25 January 1961, Tyne Tees Television broadcast the programme. That left ATV in the Midlands as the only ITV station not carrying the show. When they decided to broadcast the programme, national transmission was changed from Wednesday and Friday at 7 pm to Monday and Wednesday at 7:30 pm and the programme became fully networked under this new arrangement from episode 25 on Monday 6 March 1961.

As the ITV network grew over the next few years, the programme was transmitted by these new stations on these dates onward: Westward Television from episode 40 on 1 May 1961, Border Television from episode 76 on 4 September 1961, Grampian Television from episode 84 on 2 October 1961, Channel Television from episode 180 on 3 September 1962 and Teledu Cymru (north and west Wales) from episode 184 on 17 September 1962. At this point, the ITV network became complete and the programme was broadcast almost continuously across the country at 7:30 pm on Monday and Wednesday for the next twenty-eight years.

From episode 2981 on Friday 20 October 1989 at 7:30 pm, a third weekly episode was introduced and this increased to four episodes a week from episode 4096 on Sunday 24 November 1996, again at 7:30 pm. A second Monday episode was introduced in 2002 and was broadcast at 7:30 pm to usher in the return of Bet Lynch. The Monday 8:30 pm episode was used intermittently during the popular Richard Hillman storyline and became a regular feature from episode 5568 on Monday 25 August 2003.

In January 2008, ITV axed the Sunday episode, and instead aired a second episode on Fridays, at 8:30 pm, with the final Sunday episode airing on 6 January 2008. From 23 July 2009 to September 2012 the Wednesday show was replaced with an episode at 8:30 pm on Thursdays. A sixth weekly episode was added on Wednesdays at 8:30 pm from 20 September 2017.

In March 2020, it was revealed that episodes that were currently filming for future broadcast (as episodes are filmed a few weeks in advance) during the COVID-19 pandemic would be shown differently. Instead of six episodes a week, only three episodes would be broadcast, airing as normal on a Monday, Wednesday and Friday at the normal timeslot of 7:30 pm. The actions provided would be made effective starting from 30 March. Simultaneously, the announcement also mentioned that the elderly cast of the show would be "written off" due to health advice issued by Public Health England and the NHS. On 22 March, ITV released a statement confirming that filming of both Coronation Street and Emmerdale was suspended.

In June 2020, ITV announced that filming would resume on 9 June. However, due to the new health and safety measures, cast members over the age of 70 or with underlying health conditions did not come back on set, until the production could determine it is safe for them to return.

In July 2020, ITV announced that Coronation Street would return to the normal output of six episodes a week in September that year.

In October 2020, Maureen Lipman and David Neilson made their first appearances since July that year, as all cast members over the age of 70 had temporarily left the series earlier in the year. William Roache, Barbara Knox and Sue Nicholls returned in December.

On 22 January 2021, ITV announced that filming would be suspended from 25 January in order to rewrite "stories and scripts as a consequence of the coronavirus pandemic" and to "review all health and safety requirements". ITV also confirmed that this decision would not affect their ability to deliver six episodes a week.

In January 2022, it was announced that after 60 years in the 7.30 pm slot, Coronation Streets transmission time would move to 8pm due to the ITV Evening News having a longer duration, pushing Emmerdale into the 7.30 pm slot on weeknights. The double-bill episodes on Mondays, Wednesdays and Fridays have merged into hour-long slots on these days. The new scheduling went live on Monday 7 March 2022.

Repeats and classic episodes
Repeat episodes, omnibus broadcasts and specials have been shown on various ITV channels. After several years on ITV2, in January 2008 the omnibus returned to the main ITV channel, where it was aired on Saturday mornings or afternoons, depending on the schedule and times.

In May 2008, it moved to Sunday mornings, until August 2008, when it returned to Saturdays. In January 2009, it moved back to Sunday mornings, usually broadcasting at around 9.25am until December 2010. In January 2011, the omnibus moved to Saturday mornings on ITV at 9.25am. During the Rugby World Cup, which took place in New Zealand, matches had to be broadcast on a Saturday morning, so the omnibus moved to Saturday lunchtimes/afternoons during September and October 2011. On 22 October 2011, the omnibus moved back to Saturday mornings at 9.25am on ITV. In January 2012, the omnibus moved to ITV2, and then moved to ITV3 in January 2020. In January 2022, the omnibus moved back to ITV2.

Older episodes were broadcast by satellite and cable channel Granada Plus from its launch in 1996. The first episodes shown were from episode 1588 (originally transmitted on Monday 5 April 1976) onwards. Originally listed and promoted as Classic Coronation Street, the "classic" was dropped in early 2002, at which stage the episodes were from late 1989. By the time of the channel's closure in 2004, the repeats had reached February 1994.

In addition to this, "specials" were broadcast on Saturday afternoons in the early years of the channel, with several episodes based on a particular theme or character(s) shown. The last episode shown in these specials was from 1991. In addition, on 27 and 28 December 2003, several Christmas Day editions of the show were broadcast.

ITV3 began airing afternoon timeslot sequential reruns of Classic Coronation Street from 2 October 2017. Two classic episodes were retransmitted from Mondays to Fridays at 2:40 pm until 3:45 pm, starting from episode 2587 (originally transmitted on Wednesday 15 January 1986) onwards.

To mark the 60th anniversary of Coronation Street, between 7 and 11 December 2020 at 10:00 pm–11:05 pm, ITV3 aired special episodes of the soap including Episode 1, the tenth anniversary episode from December 1970, two episodes from the twentieth anniversary in December 1980, two episodes from the thirtieth anniversary in December 1990, the 2000 live episode from the fortieth anniversary in December 2000, and the fiftieth anniversary episode which aired after a repeat of The Road to Coronation Street.

On Easter Monday 2022, to commemorate the upcoming 90th birthday of William Roache, eight special Coronation Street Ken Barlow episodes were aired on 18 April 2022, at 10:25 am–2:35 pm. The episodes shown were Episode 1 from December 1960, Ken and Deirdre Tie the Knot from July 1981, Ken's Affair from December 1989, Deirdre's Fling from January 2003, Steve and Karen's Wedding Shocker from February 2004, Ken and Deirdre's Second Wedding from April 2005, Ken and Deirdre's Holiday from August 2014, and Deirdre's Death from July 2015.

International
Coronation Street is shown in various countries worldwide. YouTube has the first episode and many others available as reruns.

The programme was first aired in Australia in 1963 on TCN-9 Sydney, GTV-9 Melbourne and NWS-9 Adelaide, and by 1966 Coronation Street was more popular in Australia than in the UK. The show eventually left free-to-air television in Australia. It briefly returned to the Nine Network in a daytime slot during 1994–1995. In 2005, STW-9 Perth began to show episodes before the 6 pm news to improve the lead in to Nine News Perth, but this did not work and the show was cancelled a few months later. In 1996, pay-TV began and Arena began screening the series in one-hour instalments on Saturdays and Sundays at 6:30 pm EST. The series was later moved to pay-TV channel UKTV (now BBC UKTV), where it is still shown. Coronation Street is shown Mon-Thu at 7:20 pm EST and a double episode on Fridays, with episodes on the channel being one week behind UK broadcast.

In Canada, Coronation Street is broadcast on CBC Television. Until 2011, episodes were shown in Canada approximately 10 months after they aired in Britain; however, beginning in the fall of 2011, the CBC began showing two episodes every weekday, in order to catch up with the ITV showings, at 6:30 pm and 7 pm local time Monday-Friday, with an omnibus on Sundays at 7.30am. By May 2014, the CBC was only two weeks behind Britain, so the show was reduced to a single showing weeknights at 6:30 pm local time. The show debuted on Toronto's CBLT in July 1966. The 2002 edition of the Guinness Book of Records recognises the 1,144 episodes sold to the now-defunct CBC-owned Saskatoon, Saskatchewan, TV station CBKST by Granada TV on 31 May 1971 to be the largest number of TV shows ever purchased in one transaction. The show traditionally aired on weekday afternoons in Canada, with a Sunday morning omnibus. In 2004, CBC moved the weekday airings from their daytime slot to prime time. In light of austerity measures imposed on the CBC in 2012, which includes further cutbacks on non-Canadian programming, one of the foreign shows to remain on the CBC schedule is Coronation Street, according to the CBC's director of content planning Christine Wilson, who commented: "Unofficially I can tell you Coronation Street is coming back. If it didn't come back, something would happen on Parliament Hill." Kirstine Stewart, the head of the CBC's English-language division, once remarked: "Coronation Street fans are the most loyal, except maybe for curling viewers, of all CBC viewers." As of mid 2022, Canada is about three weeks behind the UK and airs six episodes per week.

In the Republic of Ireland, Coronation Street is currently shown on Virgin Media One. The show was first aired in 1978, when RTÉ2 began showing episodes from 1976, although Ireland caught up with the current UK episodes in 1983. In 1992 it moved to RTÉ One, but in 2001 Granada TV bought 45 percent of TV3, and so TV3 broadcast the series from 2001 to 2014. In 2006, ITV sold its share of the channel but TV3 continued to buy the soap until the end of 2014 when it moved to UTV Ireland. Coronation Street has broadcast on each of the main Irish networks, except for the Irish language network TG4. In December 2016, Coronation Street returned to TV3 (now Virgin Media One). The show is consistently the channels most viewed programme every week.

Two Dutch stations have broadcast Coronation Street: VARA showed 428 episodes between 1967 and 1975, and SBS6 ran the show for a period starting in 2010. From 2006 the series was also broadcast by Vitaya, a small Flemish Belgian channel.

In New Zealand, Coronation Street has been shown locally since 1964, first on NZBC television until 1975, and then on TV One, which broadcasts it in a 4-episode/2-hour block on Fridays from 7:30 pm. In September 2014, TV One added a 2-episode/1-hour block on Saturday from 8:30 pm. Because TV One did not upgrade to showing the equivalent of five or six episodes per week, New Zealand continued to fall further and further behind with episodes, and was 23 months behind Britain as of March 2014. During the weekday nights of the week ending 11 April 2014 and previous weeks, Coronation Street was the least watched programme on TV One in the 7:30 pm slot by a considerable margin in comparison to other weeknights, The serial aired on Tuesdays and Thursdays at 7:30 pm until October 2011, when the show moved to a 5:30 pm half-hour slot every weekday. The move proved unpopular with fans, and the series was quickly moved into its present prime-time slot within weeks. Episodes 7883, 7884, 7885 and 7886 were screened on 16 May 2014. These were originally aired in the UK between 4 and 11 June 2012. On 10 May 2018 it was announced that the current 2016 episodes would be moved to 1 p.m. Monday-Friday titled 'Catch-up Episodes' and for primetime Wednesday-Friday express episodes would be airing in New Zealand a week behind The United Kingdom titled '2018 Episodes' these changes would be taking place from 11 June 2018.

In South Africa, Coronation Street episodes were broadcast three days after the UK air date on ITV Choice until the channel ceased broadcasting in June 2020, episodes temporarily went off the air until they moved to M-Net City, starting in October 2020.

In the United States, Coronation Street is available by broadcast or cable only in northern markets where CBC coverage from Canada overlaps the border or is available on local cable systems. It was broadcast on CBC's US cable channel, Trio until the CBC sold its stake in the channel to Universal, before it was shut down in 2006. Beginning in 2009, episodes were available in the United States through Amazon.com's on-demand service, a month behind their original UK airdates. The final series of shows available from Amazon appears to be from November 2012, as no new episodes have been uploaded. On 15 January 2013, online distributor Hulu began airing episodes of the show, posting a new episode daily, two weeks after their original airdates. For a time, Hulu's website stated: "New episodes of Coronation Street will be unavailable as of April 7th, 2016", with the same being said for British soap Hollyoaks, but Hulu is once again showing new episodes of Coronation Street as of April 2017, two weeks behind the UK airdate. The BBC/ITV service Britbox shows new episodes on the same day as the UK airing. Coronation Street was also shown on USA Network for an unknown period starting in 1982.

HM Forces and their families stationed overseas can watch Coronation Street on ITV, carried by the British Forces Broadcasting Service, which is also available to civilians in the Falkland Islands. It used to be shown on BFBS1.

Satellite channel ITV Choice showed the programme in Asia, Middle East, Cyprus, and Malta, before the channel ceased broadcasting in 2019.

Merchandise
The Street, a magazine dedicated to the show, was launched in 1989. Edited by Bill Hill, the magazine contained a summary of recent storylines, interviews, articles about classic episodes, and stories that occurred from before 1960. The format was initially A5 size, expanding to A4 from the seventh issue. The magazine folded after issue 23 in 1993 when the publisher's contract with Granada Studios Tour expired and Granada wanted to produce their own magazine.

On 25 June 2010, a video game of the show was released on Nintendo DS. The game was developed by Mindscape, and allowed players to complete tasks in the fictitious town of Weatherfield.

Discography
In 1995, to commemorate the programme's 35th anniversary, a CD titled The Coronation Street Album was released, featuring cover versions of modern songs and standards by contemporary cast members.

The album charted a Top 40 hit when "The Coronation Street Single" (a double a-side featuring a cover of Monty Python's "Always Look on the Bright Side of Life" by Bill Waddington - with various cast members on backing vocals - on one side and  "Something Stupid" by Johnny Briggs & Amanda Barrie on the other) reached number 35 in the Official UK charts.

In 2010, an album featuring songs sung by cast members was released to celebrate 50 years of Coronation Street. The album is titled Rogues, Angels, Heroes & Fools, and was later developed into a musical.

Spin-offs

Television
Granada launched one spin-off in 1965, Pardon the Expression, following the story of clothing store manager Leonard Swindley (Arthur Lowe) after he left Weatherfield. Swindley's management experience was tested when he was appointed assistant manager at a fictional department store, Dobson and Hawks. Granada produced two series of the spin-off, which ended in 1966.

In 1967, Arthur Lowe returned as Leonard Swindley in Turn Out the Lights, a short-lived sequel to Pardon the Expression. It ran for just one series of six episodes before it was cancelled.

From 1985 to 1988 Granada TV produced a sitcom called The Brothers McGregor featuring a pair of half-brothers (one black, one white) who had appeared in a single episode of Coronation Street as old friends of Eddie Yeats and guests at his wedding. The original actors were unavailable so the characters were recast with Paul Barber and Philip Whitchurch. The show ran for 26 episodes over four series.

In 1985, a sister series, Albion Market was launched. It ran for one year, with 100 episodes produced.

Crossovers
In 2010, several actors from the show appeared on The Jeremy Kyle Show as their soap characters: David Platt (Jack P. Shepherd), Nick Tilsley (Ben Price), Tina McIntyre (Michelle Keegan) and Graeme Proctor (Craig Gazey). In the fictional, semi-improvised scenario, David accused Nick (his brother) and Tina (his ex-girlfriend) of sleeping together.

Coronation Street and rival soap opera EastEnders had a crossover for Children in Need in November 2010 called "East Street". EastEnders stars that visited Weatherfield include Laurie Brett as Jane Beale, Charlie G. Hawkins as Darren Miller, Kylie Babbington as Jodie Gold, Nina Wadia as Zainab Masood and John Partridge as Christian Clarke.

On 21 December 2012, Coronation Street produced a Text Santa special entitled A Christmas Corrie which featured Norris Cole in the style of Scrooge, being visited by the ghosts of dead characters. The ghosts were Mike Baldwin, Maxine Peacock, Derek Wilton and Vera Duckworth. Other special guests include Torvill and Dean, Lorraine Kelly and Sheila Reid. The episode concluded with Norris learning the error of his ways and dancing on the cobbles. The original plan for this feature was to have included Jack Duckworth, along with Vera, but actor Bill Tarmey died before filming commenced. In the end a recording of his voice was played.

Documentaries
Coronation Street: Family Album was several documentaries about various families living on the street.

"Farewell ..." was several documentaries featuring the best moments of a single character who had recently left the series—most notably, Farewell Mike (Baldwin), Farewell Vera (Duckworth), Farewell Blanche (Hunt), Farewell Jack (Duckworth), Farewell Janice (Battersby), Farewell Liz (McDonald), Farewell Becky (McDonald), and Farewell Tina (McIntyre). Most of these were broadcast on the same day as the character's final scenes in the series.

Stars on the Street was aired around Christmas 2009. It featured actors from the soap talking about the famous guest stars who had appeared in the series including people who were in it before they were famous.

In December 2010, ITV made a few special programmes to mark the 50th anniversary. Coronation Street Uncovered: Live, hosted by Stephen Mulhern was shown after the episode with the tram crash was aired on ITV2. On 7 and 9 December a countdown on the greatest Corrie moments, Coronation Street: 50 Years, 50 Moments, the viewers voted "The Barlows at Alcoholics Anonymous" as the greatest moment. On 10 December Paul O'Grady hosted a quiz show, Coronation Street: The Big 50 with three teams from the soap and a celebrity team answering questions about Coronation Street and other soaps. Also, Come Dine with Me and Celebrity Juice aired Coronation Street specials in the anniversary week.

International adaptation
The German TV series Lindenstraße took Coronation Street as the model. Lindenstraße started in 1985 and broadcast its final episode on 29 March 2020, after airing for nearly 35 years.

Films
Over the years, Coronation Street has released several straight-to-video films. Unlike other soaps, which often used straight-to-video films to cover more contentious plot lines that may not be allowed by the broadcaster, Coronation Street has largely used these films to reset their characters in other locations.

In 1995, Coronation Street: The Cruise also known as Coronation Street: The Feature Length Special was released on VHS to celebrate the 35th anniversary of the show, featuring Rita Sullivan, Mavis Wilton, Alec Gilroy, Curly Watts and Raquel Watts. ITV heavily promoted the programme as a direct-to-video exclusive, but broadcast a brief version of it on 24 March 1996. The Independent Television Commission investigated the broadcast, as viewers complained that ITV misled them.

In 1997, following the controversial cruise spin-off, Coronation Street: Viva Las Vegas! was released on VHS, featuring Vera Duckworth, Jack Duckworth, Fiona Middleton and Maxine Peacock on a trip to Las Vegas, which included the temporary return of Ray Langton.

In 1999, six special episodes of Coronation Street were produced, following the story of Steve McDonald and Vikram Desai in Brighton, which included the temporary returns of Bet Gilroy, Reg Holdsworth and Vicky McDonald. This video was titled Coronation Street: Open All Hours and released on VHS.

In 2008, ITV announced filming was to get underway for a new special DVD episode, Coronation Street: Out of Africa, featuring Kirk Sutherland, Fiz Brown, Chesney Brown, which included the temporary return of Cilla Battersby-Brown. Sophie Webster, Becky Granger and Tina McIntyre also make brief appearances.

In 2009, another DVD special, Coronation Street: Romanian Holiday, was released. The feature-length comedy drama followed Roy, Hayley and Becky as they travelled to Romania for the wedding of a face from their past. Eddie Windass also briefly appears.

The BBC commissioned a one-off drama called The Road to Coronation Street, about how the series first came into being. Jessie Wallace plays Pat Phoenix (Elsie Tanner) with Lynda Baron as Violet Carson (Ena Sharples), Celia Imrie as Doris Speed (Annie Walker) and James Roache as his own father William Roache (Ken Barlow). It was broadcast on 16 September 2010 on BBC Four.

On 1 November 2010, Coronation Street: A Knight's Tale was released. Reg Holdsworth and Curly Watts returned in the film. Mary tries to take Norris to an apparently haunted castle where she hoped to seduce him. Rosie gets a job there and she takes Jason with her. Brian Capron also guest starred as an assumed relative of Richard Hillman. He rises out of a lake with a comedic "wink to the audience" after Hillman drowned in 2003. Rita Sullivan also briefly appears.

Online
On 21 December 2008, a web-based miniseries ran on ITV.com; called Corrie Confidential; the first episode featured the characters Rosie and Sophie Webster in Underworld.

ITV.com launched a small spin-off drama series called 'Gary's Army Diaries' which revolves around Gary Windass's experiences in Afghanistan and the loss of his best friend, Quinny. Due to their popularity, the three five-minute episodes were recut into a single 30-minute episode, which was broadcast on ITV2.

William Roache and Anne Kirkbride starred as Ken and Deirdre in a series of ten three-minute internet 'webisodes'. The first episode of the series titled, Ken and Deirdre's Bedtime Stories was activated on Valentine's Day 2011.

In 2011, an internet based spin-off starring Helen Flanagan as Rosie Webster followed her on her quest to be a supermodel called Just Rosie.

On 3 February 2014, another web-based miniseries ran on ITV.com; called Streetcar Stories. It showed what Steve and Lloyd get up to during the late nights in their Streetcar cab office. The first episode shows Steve and Lloyd making a cup of tea with "The Stripper" playing in the background, referencing Morecambe and Wise's Breakfast Sketch. The second episode involves the pair having a biscuit dunking competition.

During the 'Who Attacked Ken' storyline, a mini series of police files was run on the official Coronation Street YouTube channel. They outlined the suspects' details and possible motives.

Stage

In August 2010, many Coronation Street characters were brought to the stage in Jonathan Harvey's comedy play Corrie!. The play was commissioned to celebrate the 50th Anniversary of the TV series and was presented at The Lowry in Salford, England by ITV Studios and Phil McIntyre Entertainments. Featuring a cast of six actors who alternate roles of favourite characters including Ena Sharples, Hilda Ogden, Hayley and Roy, Richard Hillman, Jack and Vera, Bet Lynch, Steve, Karen and Becky, the play weaves together some of the most memorable moments from the TV show. It toured UK theatres between February 2011 and July 2011 with guest star narrators including Roy Barraclough, Ken Morley and Gaynor Faye.

In popular culture
The British rock band Queen produced a single "I Want to Break Free" in 1984 that reached number 3 in the UK Singles Chart. The song is memorable for its music video in which the band members dressed in women's clothing, which parodied characters in Coronation Street and is considered an homage to the show. The video depicts Freddie Mercury as a housewife, loosely based on Bet Lynch, who wants to "break free" from his life. Although Lynch was a blonde in the soap opera, Mercury thought he would look too silly as a blonde and chose a dark wig. Guitarist Brian May plays another, more relaxed housewife based on Hilda Ogden.
 
In December 2022, the American singer Bob Dylan was offered a cameo on Coronation Street after revealing to the Wall Street Journal that he is a fan of the ITV soap.

Sponsorship
Cadbury was the first sponsor of Coronation Street, beginning in July 1996. In the summer of 2006, Cadbury Trebor Bassetts had to recall over one million chocolate bars, due to suspected salmonella contamination, and Coronation Street stopped the sponsorship for several months. In 2006, Cadbury did not renew their contract, but agreed to sponsor the show until Coronation Street found a new sponsor.

Harveys then sponsored Coronation Street from 30 September 2007 until December 2012. In the Coronation Street: Romanian Holiday film, Roy and Hayley Cropper are filmed in front of a Harveys store, and in Coronation Street: A Knights Tale, a Harveys truck can be seen driving past Mary Taylor's motorhome. Compare The Market took over as sponsor from 26 November 2012 until 30 November 2020. On 10 December 2020, it was announced that Argos would be the new sponsor of Coronation Street, starting on 1 January 2021.

In November 2011, a Nationwide Building Society ATM in Dev Alahan's corner shop became the first use of paid-for product placement in a UK primetime show. In 2018, the shop fronts of Co-Op and Costa Coffee were added to the sets, along with characters using shopping bags with the respective logos on as props.

Hyundai have been the sponsor since January 2015 in the Republic of Ireland, aired on Virgin Media One.

Awards and nominations

Footnotes

Print references

Video and DVD references
 This Is Coronation Street, Dir: John Black (DVD) Acorn Media Publishing, 2003
 Coronation Street: Secrets, Dir: John Black (DVD) Morningstar Entertainment, 2004
 Coronation Street: Early Days, (Video) Granada Media Group, 2001
 Coronation Street: The Jubilee Years, (Video) Granada Media Group, 1985
 Coronation Street: The Magic of, (Video) Granada Media Group, 1985

External links

 
 
 

 
1960 British television series debuts
1960s British television soap operas
1970s British television soap operas
1980s British television soap operas
1990s British television soap operas
2000s British television soap operas
2010s British television soap operas
2020s British television soap operas
Alcohol abuse in television
BAFTA winners (television series)
Black-and-white British television shows
British television soap operas
English-language television shows
Fictional streets and roads
History of Manchester
ITV soap operas
Social realism
Television shows produced by Granada Television
Television series by ITV Studios
Television shows set in Greater Manchester
Television productions suspended due to the COVID-19 pandemic
Television series impacted by the COVID-19 pandemic